The European Landscape Contractors Association (ELCA) is the European association of garden- and landscape-contractors based in Bad Honnef, Germany. The ELCA was founded in 1963 in order to promote cooperation as well as the exchange of information and experience in Europe.

The main goals of the ELCA are the following:
 Promote the mutual exchange of information and experience
 Look after the interests of landscape contractors Europe-wide
 Support the vocational training of young people and the mutual exchange of young qualified landscape gardeners
 Promote cooperation with organizations with similar goals Europe-wide

Members
21 national landscaping associations are currently full members of the ELCA:
 Belgium: Belgische Federatie Groenvoorzieners / Fédération Belge Entrepreneurs (BFG / FBEP)
 Denmark: Danske Anlægsgartnere (DAG)
 Germany: Bundesverband Garten-, Landschafts- und Sportplatzbau e.V. (BGL)
 Finland: Viheraluerakentajat r.y.
 France: Union Nationale des Entrepreneurs du Paysage (UNEP)
 Greece: Greek National Union of Agriculturist Landscape Contractors (PEEGEP)
 Great Britain: The British Association of Landscape Industries (BALI)
 Ireland: Association of Landscape Contractors of Ireland (ALCI)
 Italy: Associazione Italiana Costruttori Del Verde (ASSOVERDE)
 Luxembourg: Fédération Horticole Luxembourgeoise (A.S.B.L.)
 Malta: Environmental Landscapes Consortium Limited
 Netherlands: Vereniging van Hoveniers en Groenvoorzieners (VHG)
 Norway: Norsk Anleggsgartnermesterlag (NAML)
 Austria: Bundesinnung der Gärtner und Floristen
 Poland: Stowarzyszenie Architektury Krajobrazu (Zieleń Polska)
 Russia: Guild of Professionals in Landscape Industry (GPLI)
 Sweden: Sveriges Trädgardanläggningsförbund (STAF)
 Switzerland: JardinSuisse
 Spain: Federación Española de Empresas de Jardinería (FEEJ)
 Czech Republic: Svaz zakládání a údržby zeleně (SZÚZ)
 Hungary: Magyar Kertépítö és Fenntartó Vállalkozók Országos Szövetsége (MAKEOSZ)

Additionally, the ELCA has five associated members
 China: Landscape Architecture Corporation of China
 EAC: European Arboricultural Council
 Japan: Japan Federation of Landscape Contractors
 Canada: Canadian Nursery Landscape Association / Association Canadienne des Pépiniéristes
 United States of America: American Nursery & Landscape Association (ANLA)

External links

Garden Workshops

Horticultural organizations
Business organizations based in Europe